Nepal Co-operative Party is a political party in Nepal. The party is registered with the Election Commission of Nepal ahead of the 2008 Constituent Assembly election. The party supports the formation of rural cooperatives.

References

Cooperative parties
Political parties in Nepal